Guillermo Cañete (born 11 July 1949) is a Cuban water polo player. He competed at the 1968 Summer Olympics and the 1972 Summer Olympics.

References

1949 births
Living people
Cuban male water polo players
Olympic water polo players of Cuba
Water polo players at the 1968 Summer Olympics
Water polo players at the 1972 Summer Olympics
Sportspeople from Havana